Kylie Ann Louw (born 15 January 1989, Johannesburg) is a South African women's footballer and plays as a midfielder. She plays for Stephen F. Austin University. She represented the South Africa women's national football team at the 2012 London Olympics.

References

Living people
1989 births
Sportspeople from Johannesburg
Women's association football midfielders
South African women's soccer players
South Africa women's international soccer players
Footballers at the 2012 Summer Olympics
Olympic soccer players of South Africa
South African expatriate soccer players
Stephen F. Austin State University alumni
Stephen F. Austin Ladyjacks soccer players
Afrikaner people